The 2023 CEBL season is the fifth season of the Canadian Elite Basketball League (CEBL). It will begin on May 24, 2023, and ends on July 30, 2023. It is the inaugural season for the Calgary Surge and the Winnipeg Sea Bears, Calgary Surge relocated from Guelph while Winnipeg was granted an expansion franchise.

This year will be the first season where the league will be divided in two conferences. The top four teams in each conference will qualify for the playoffs, unless the Vancouver Bandits finish in fifth place in the Western Conference, where the fourth-place team will be eliminated instead; as hosts, the Bandits automatically qualify for the semi-finals, along with the first-place team from the Eastern Conference. The playoffs commence with the third- and fourth-placed teams in play-in matches, with the winners facing their own conference's second-place teams in the quarterfinals. The quarterfinal winners will then face their respective division semi-final opponent.

On March 16, 2023, CEBL announced a tv deal with TSN, TSN will televise weekly games and broadcast the rest of the games online, they will also televise the championship weekend.

Regular season

Standings

Western Conference

Eastern Conference

Results

Awards
Source:
Player of the Year: 
Canadian Player of the Year:
U Sports Developmental Player of the Year: 
Defensive Player of the Year: 
Referee of the Year: 
Clutch Player of the Year: 
Coach of the Year: 
6th man of the year:
CEBL Final MVP:

All-CEBL teams

All Canadian team
Source:

Forwards

 
 

Guards

Notes

References

External links 

Canadian Elite Basketball League
2022–23 in Canadian basketball
CEBL season
Sports in Canada